Bakken Bears is a Danish professional basketball club based in Aarhus. The club plays in the Basketligaen, the top tier basketball league in Denmark. 

Founded in 1953, the club has won the Basketligaen 20 times and holds the record for the most championships and has won 11 Danish Cups. Along with their domestic play, the club is a regular in European competitions. The Bears are a three-time semifinalist of the FIBA Europe Cup.

History

Bakken Bears was formed in 1953 under the name of Aarhus Basketball Forening, or simply ABF. From 1962, the club was known as Skovbakken Basketball. Bears has been in the top Danish league almost every year since then and won its first title in 1958. Since then, the club has won a number of domestic titles and is now the most winning sports team in the history of the city of Aarhus.

In the years 2005 to 2009, Bakken Bears was a part of Aarhus Elite A/S, an elite sports organization in Aarhus that includes ia. AGF Football (soccer). In the last months of 2009 a group of local businessmen, sponsors and fans bought the team.

When Bakken Bears hosted Team FOG Næstved in Game 1 of the league semifinals in March 2009, 4,816 spectators watched the game in Aarhus Arena, which set an all-time attendance record for basketball in Denmark.

In the summer of 2018, the Bears' development team EBAA entered the Basketligaen as well.

On 27 March 2018, Bakken Bears qualified for the first time ever for a semifinal of a European competition, by eliminating ESSM Le Portel in the quarterfinals of the FIBA Europe Cup.

Players

Current roster

Notable players

Individual awards

Basketligaen MVP
Eric Bell – 2003
DeVaughn Akoon-Purcell – 2017
Ryan Evans – 2019

Basketligaen Finals MVP
Chris Christoffersen – 2013
Kenny Barker – 2014
DeVaughn Akoon-Purcell – 2017
Jeffrey Crockett – 2018
Tobin Carberry – 2019
Michel Diouf – 2021
Marvelle Harris – 2022

Honours

Domestic competitions
Basketligaen  
 Winners (20) : 1957–58, 1996–97, 1998–99, 1999–00, 2000–01, 2003–04, 2004–05, 2006–07, 2007–08, 2008–09, 2010–11, 2011–12, 2012–13, 2013–14, 2016–17, 2017–18, 2018–19, 2019–20, 2020–21, 2021–22
Runners-up (8) : 1962–63, 1964–65, 1989–90, 1997–98, 2002–03, 2005–2006, 2009–10, 2014–15
Danish Cup
Winners (12): 1999, 2000, 2003, 2004, 2006, 2008, 2009, 2010, 2011, 2013, 2016, 2018, 2019–20, 2020–21
 Runners-up (7) : 1980, 1995, 2002, 2005, 2012, 2014, 2021–22

European competitions
FIBA Europe Cup
Semi-finalist (3): 2017–18, 2019–20, 2021–22

Season by season

Head coaches
  Steffen Wich

References

External links
Official Website 
Eurobasket.com Bakken Bears Page

Sport in Aarhus
Basketball teams in Denmark
Basketball teams established in 1954